Banská Belá is a village and municipality in Banská Štiavnica District, in the Banská Bystrica Region of central Slovakia. It has a population of 1,234.

Names and etymology
The settlements got its name after the creek Biela (1228 torrens Bela, now Starý potok), in Slovak "white".   The village founded on the creek was named Bana (a mine), later Biela Bana to distinguish between Banská Belá and Banská Štiavnica which was called also Bana. The Hungarian name Feyerbanya and its variations are translations of the Slovak name. The origin of the German name Dill is uncertain.

The first written mention is probably terra nomine bela (1288), older sources mention also an unreliable record terra banensium (1156).

History
The village arose by separation from Banská Štiavnica, but it was part of Banská Štiavnica again from 1873 to 1954.

In 1331 , King Béla IV invited German miners from Banská Štiavnica and the village got the German name Dilln (Dyln, Dilln, Dylen). The village suffered from Turkish raids during the Ottoman wars.

Genealogical resources

The records for genealogical research are available at the state archive "Statny Archiv in Banska Bystrica, Slovakia"

 Roman Catholic church records (births/marriages/deaths): 1688-1895(parish A)
 Lutheran church records (births/marriages/deaths): 1678-1905(parish B)

See also
 List of municipalities and towns in Slovakia

References

External links
Official website of Banská Belá 
Basic information about Banská Belá 
Surnames of living people in Banska Bela

Villages and municipalities in Banská Štiavnica District